Xie Hangsheng (born 1955) was a Chinese diplomat. He was born in Hangzhou, Zhejiang. He was Ambassador of the People's Republic of China to Bulgaria (2003–2005) and Denmark (2007–2011). He was a vice-minister of the Ministry of Foreign Affairs of the People's Republic of China.

References

1955 births
Living people
Ambassadors of China to Bulgaria
Ambassadors of China to Denmark
Politicians from Hangzhou
Vice-ministers of the Ministry of Foreign Affairs of the People's Republic of China
People's Republic of China politicians from Zhejiang